"Love Rears Its Ugly Head" is a single released by Living Colour in 1990 from their second album Time's Up.

It is in the style of most of the group's previous singles, a rock song with touches of R&B, especially in the vocals. It is most noted for its funk-style guitar parts that permeate throughout the entire song. It takes a sample from the song Lush Life by Nat King Cole. The music video features Cynthia Bailey of The Real Housewives of Atlanta fame.

The track peaked at number 8 on the Modern Rock Tracks chart in the United States and, in a heavily remixed form with re-recorded vocals and less of a rock influence, became the band's biggest hit single in the UK, peaking at number 12 on the UK Singles Chart.

Charts

References

Living Colour songs
1990 songs
Songs written by Vernon Reid
Song recordings produced by Ed Stasium
Epic Records singles
Rock ballads

1991 singles